Kal Aaj Aur Kal is a 1971 Indian Hindi-language film produced by Raj Kapoor and directed by his son Randhir Kapoor. The film's USP is the appearance of three generations of the famous Kapoor family. The film stars Prithviraj Kapoor, Raj Kapoor, Randhir Kapoor (in his acting debut) and his real-life wife-to-be Babita.

It was also the last Shankar Jaikishan score in a Raj Kapoor film. This film came after the heavy debacle of Mera Naam Joker, which was Raj Kapoor's dream project. It more than made up for his loss although it was still only a moderate success at the box office. The film marked one of Prithviraj Kapoor's final films as he died the following year of the film's release.

Plot 
The title is an allegory to the ideological clash between three generations: Kal (Grandparent – representing the past), Aaj (Parent – representing the present), and Kal(Youth – representing the future). Diwan Bahadur Kapoor (Prithviraj Kapoor) is the father of Ram Bahadur Kapoor (Raj Kapoor). Ram's son Rajesh (Randhir Kapoor), who had been sent to London for higher studies, returns to India. Diwan Bahadur has promised his childhood friend that Rajesh's marriage will be done with the latter's granddaughter, Laxmi.

However, Rajesh is in love with his girlfriend Monica "Mona" (Babita),and objects to the marriage alliance by his grandfather. Both the grandfather and the grandson stick to their guns, little realizing that Ram is the real sufferer in the clash. Ram finds himself in trouble when Diwan threatens to leave if Rajesh marries Mona and Rajesh threatens to leave if Diwan makes him marry Laxmi. Unable to decide whether he wants his father or son, Ram leaves his home, leaving the grandfather and grandson blaming each other. 

Ram's friend gives him a idea, where he pretends to only want to stay in a hotel and drink a lot. Rajesh and Diwan see his state and decide to pretend to have sorted their issues. The overjoyed Ram throws a party in celebration, however, he overhears his father and son talk about the act. Angered, he leaves the party.

Soon later, Diwan falls sick. He tells Rajesh and his father that he's happy with everything except not getting to see his grandson's wedding. The sad Rajesh decides to give up his love for his grandfather's happiness. He tells Mona the news and she accepts his decision and is ready to come to his wedding. At the wedding, he marries Laxmi but can't see Mona at all. Diwan asks him why he looks so sad and tells the bride to lift up the veil, revealing that the girl he married wasn't Laxmi but Mona instead. Diwan tells him that if he was ready to sacrifice so much for him, so he must sacrifice a little bit for Rajesh. After marriage, Rajesh scatters his grandfather's ashes and his son is born, with Ram happy at becoming a grandfather.

Cast 
Prithviraj Kapoor as Diwan Bahadur Kapoor
Raj Kapoor as Ram Kapoor
Randhir Kapoor as Rajesh Kapoor
Babita Kapoor as Mona
Achala Sachdev as Achala
David as Munshi
Iftekhar as Ram's Friend
Roopesh Kumar as Sunny

Soundtrack 
All music composed by Shankar–Jaikishan, in their last collaboration with R. K. Films. Three months prior to the film's release, Jaikishan passed away due to cirrhosis of the liver. Nonetheless, three Kishore Kumar numbers from the soundtrack became subsequent hits. These were the solo, Bhanware Ki Gunjan, and a couple duets with Asha Bhosle, Aap Yahan Aaye Kisliye and Tick Tick Tick Chalti Jaye Ghadi.

References

External links 
 

1971 films
1970s Hindi-language films
Films scored by Shankar–Jaikishan
R. K. Films films
1971 directorial debut films